Loch Neaton is a freshwater lake near Watton in Norfolk, England. It was created after earth was excavated in 1875 to create a mile long embankment for the extension to Swaffham of the Thetford to Watton railway station. Local businessmen saw the potential of creating a leisure park in the area, with a tennis court, bowling green and bandstand. The excavated area was filled with water to create a lake for swimming, boating and fishing.

In honor of the railway labourers that created the excavation, who were mainly Scottish, the lake was called a Loch.

References

External links
 Official website

Neaton